Süß und Gemein is the second studio album of the German rock/pop duo Lucilectric, released in 1996. The album reached #45 in the Austrian charts, while the highest-charting single, Liebe macht dumm, reached #20.

Track listing

Charts

Singles

References

1996 albums
Lucilectric albums